A partial solar eclipse occurred on May 25, 1808.  A solar eclipse occurs when the Moon passes between Earth and the Sun, thereby totally or partly obscuring the image of the Sun for a viewer on Earth. A partial solar eclipse occurs in the polar regions of the Earth when the center of the Moon's shadow misses the Earth.

Description
The eclipse was visible in the southernmost part of Africa including the south of Bechuanaland (now Botswana), southern Namaqualand (now Namibia), areas that are today South Africa especially the Cape Colony, Limpopo, Mpunalanga and Zululand, is also included modern Lesotho and Swaziland, it was also visible in the Southern Ocean, where the Atlantic and the Indian Ocean meet and included the small islands of Tristan da Cunha, Prince Edward and Bouvet.

The eclipse started at sunrise in the southwest part of the Atlantic Ocean around northwest of the South Georgia Islands and ended at sunset southwest of the Kergueren Islands.

It showed about up to 15% obscurity in Africa, south of 60, it shown up to over 50% obscurity of the sun.  The greatest eclipse was in the southwest portion of Indian Ocean just north of Antarctica.

See also 
 List of solar eclipses in the 19th century

References

External links 
 Google interactive maps
 Solar eclipse data

1808 5 25
1808 in science
1808 5 25
May 1808 events